Palau requires its residents to register their motor vehicles and display vehicle registration plates. Current plates are North American standard 6 × 12 inches (152 × 305 mm). Most states issue metal plates, some stamped; however, some are hand painted, stenciled or of printed laminated paper on a wooden base. Most states issue new plates every few years, others use revalidation through stickers.

The designs of the plates vary by state, with each state issuing their own plates, although some states have less than 100 residents and the largest just 14,000. Palau witnessed several instances of political violence in the 1980s, due to state-by-state conflict over the nuclear issue, so in the 1990s a national plate was issued. This has since reverted to state-by-state production.

Regular plates

Diplomatic plates

Government plates

Special plates

References

Palau
Transport in Palau
Palau transport-related lists